The 1953 Oregon Webfoots football team represented the University of Oregon as a member of the Pacific Coast Conference (PCC) during the 1953 college football season. In their third season under head coach Len Casanova, the Webfoots compiled a 4–5–1 record (2–5–1 against PCC opponents), finished in eighth place in the PCC, and outscored their opponents, 91 to 85. The team played its home games at Hayward Field in Eugene, Oregon.

Schedule

References

Oregon
Oregon Ducks football seasons
Oregon Webfoots football